InnoDB is a storage engine for the database management system MySQL and MariaDB. Since the release of MySQL 5.5.5 in 2010, it replaced MyISAM as MySQL's default table type. It provides the standard ACID-compliant transaction features, along with foreign key support (Declarative Referential Integrity).  It is included as standard in most binaries distributed by MySQL AB, the exception being some OEM versions.

Description

InnoDB became a product of Oracle Corporation after its acquisition of the Finland-based company Innobase in October 2005. The software is dual licensed; it is distributed under the GNU General Public License, but can also be licensed to parties wishing to combine InnoDB in proprietary software.

InnoDB supports:
 Both SQL and XA transactions
 Tablespaces
 Foreign keys
 Full text search indexes, since MySQL 5.6 (February 2013) and MariaDB 10.0
 Spatial operations, following the OpenGIS standard
 Virtual columns, in MariaDB

See also
 Comparison of MySQL database engines

References

External links
 Mysqltutorial.org, InnoDB and other table types in MySQL
 The InnoDB Storage Engine, in the MySQL manual.

Database engines
MySQL
MariaDB
Oracle software